Lester Wilson (April 13, 1942 – February 14, 1993) was an African-American dancer, choreographer, and actor.  Wilson attended the Juilliard School.   Bob Fosse cast him in a 1963 revival of Pal Joey at the New York City Center.  Wilson toured London with Sammy Davis, Jr. in Golden Boy. In 1969 he was responsible with 24 of his dancers for the choreography of Johnny Hallyday's show at the Palais des Sports in Paris.

Lester's best known choreography was the 1977 movie Saturday Night Fever for which he coached John Travolta. Wilson had choreographed for Diana Ross, Dalida, Gladys Knight, Billy Crystal, Liza Minnelli and Ann-Margret, in her Las Vegas stage spectaculars. He also choreographed the 1992 movie Sister Act.

In 1991, Wilson was nominated for an American Emmy Award for the choreography in the ABC special American Dance Honors.  Lester also choreographed several Broadway musicals,  including Grind with Ben Vereen.

In February 1993, Wilson died of a heart attack in Los Angeles at the age of 50. Wilson was a major contributor to the fight against AIDS, notably in choreography created for AIDS Project/L.A. He had previously undergone a quintuple bypass in 1979 at the age of 37.

He also appeared on Good Times as a grocery store manager in a 1975 episode entitled "Florida's Protest"

Personal life
He was gay.

Filmography
Der Kommissar, episode In letzter Minute, West Germany (1970), musical act, actor
Funny Lady (1975) Columbia Pictures Corp., assistant choreographer
Saturday Night Fever (1977), choreographer
Beat Street (1984), choreographer
The Last Dragon (1985) with co-choreographer Lawrence Leritz
Scrooged (1988) Paramount Pictures—choreographer, actor
Hot Shots! (1991) Twentieth Century Fox, choreographer
Hot Shots! Part Deux (1993) Twentieth Century Fox, choreographer
Sister Act (1992) Touchstone Pictures, musical staging
Made in America (1993) Stonebridge Entertainment, choreographer

References

External links

1942 births
1993 deaths
Artists from New York City
American male musical theatre actors
American choreographers
African-American male dancers
LGBT African Americans
American male film actors
American male television actors
Juilliard School alumni
20th-century American male actors
20th-century American singers
20th-century American male singers
American male dancers
Gay men
20th-century African-American male singers
20th-century LGBT people